Alfred Sheldon was an English professional footballer. He played in the English Football League for Coventry City and Wrexham. He also played for Worcester City, Dudley Town, Wellington, Shrewsbury Town and Redditch Town.

References

Year of birth missing
Year of death missing
English footballers
Association football wingers
English Football League players
Worcester City F.C. players
Dudley Town F.C. players
Coventry City F.C. players
Wellington A.F.C. players
Wrexham A.F.C. players
Shrewsbury Town F.C. players
Redditch United F.C. players
People from Smethwick